Kantvik is a village in Kirkkonummi municipality in Uusimaa, Finland. Nearby services include a primary school and a Sale grocery store. There is a bus connection from Kantvik to the center of Kirkkonummi, such as lines 172, 173 and 904.

There is industry in Kantvik, such as the Suomen Sokeri sugar factory, and Mildola, which manufactures vegetable oil products. Kantvik has also two harbour areas, one of which, with an area of about five hectares, the Port of Helsinki manages.

See also 
 Upinniemi

References

External links 
 Kantvik.fi – Official Site (in Finnish)

Kirkkonummi
Villages in Finland